Captain Mohan Narayan Rao Samant, MVC (1930 – 20 March 2019) was an officer of the Indian Navy, who was awarded with the Maha Vir Chakra, India's second-highest war-time gallantry award. Samant played an important role in the covert operation called Naval Commando Operation X, which was instituted in 1971 during the Bangladesh Liberation War. Samant had also served as the first commanding officer of the submarine INS Karanj after being appointed to that post in 1969. After the 1971 war ended, he became the first temporary Chief of Naval Staff of the newly-created Bangladesh Navy.

Early life 
Samant was born in 1930. His domicile was Pune, Maharashtra.

Career 
In 1969, Samant was appointed by the Indian Navy as the commissioning Commanding Officer of the submarine INS Karanj.

In 1971, he became an officer attached to the Eastern Naval Command of the Indian Navy. During this tenure, his involvement in covert operations started. In April 1971, before the Indo-Pakistani War of 1971 started, the Naval Commando Operations (X) began training more than 400 Bengali college students and eight submariners as marine-warfare soldiers to carry out covert operations inside the erstwhile East Pakistan. The soldiers trained to swim with limpet mines and use them to destroy Pakistani shipping. Samant was involved in this training process, being the Staff Officer, G1 of the Naval Commando Operations (X).

Bangladesh Liberation War of 1971

Operation X 
Operation X was a covert operation run by the Indian Navy during the Bangladesh Liberation War of 1971. It involved attacking the vulnerable maritime shipping associated with East Pakistan to cutoff logistics and supplies to Pakistani forces in East Pakistan, thereby easing the advance of the Indian Army. The operation involved the marine-warfare soldiers trained by Samant and his colleagues preceding the War.

Only three Naval officers and the Indian Prime Minister had the full knowledge of the operation. Commander Samant (who later became a Captain) was one of them and was responsible for the field execution of Operation X. The other two officers were Admiral SM Nanda, then chief of the Indian Navy, and Captain M. K. Roy, then director of India's Naval Intelligence.

Damage or complete destruction was inflicted on about 60,000 tonnes of shipping during Operation Jackpot, which was executed by 176 soldiers under the leadership of Samant.

Overall, the operation resulted in around 100,000 tonnes of logistical and supply shipping being sunk or damaged; the operation emerged as the largest covert maritime operation in history, being bigger than those which were undertaken during the Vietnam War and World War II.

Other engagements 
Captain Samant led an attack involving three gunboats on Pakistani ships on the Pussur River during the period between 7–10 December 1971. Two of the boats were lost to friendly fire from the Indian Air Force. Samant rescued survivors and continued the attack.

First Chief of Bangladesh Navy 
Samant subsequently became the first temporary Chief of Naval Staff of the newly created Bangladesh Navy and was awarded the 'Friend of Liberation war' honour. He remained chief till early 1972 when he was succeeded by Nurul Huq.

Later life and death
Samant retired on 22 July 1974. He died after a cardiac arrest at the age of 89 on 20 March 2019 at 11.53 AM in the Arogya Nidhi Hospital located in the suburbs of Mumbai. He was accorded a military funeral.

Maha Vir Chakra 
Samant was awarded the  Maha Vir Chakra, India's second-highest gallantry award, in 1971.

The citation for the Maha Vir Chakra reads as follows:

Books 
Samant has co-authored the book Operation X: The Untold Story of India's Covert Naval War in East Pakistan with Sandeep Unnithan.

See also 
 Bangladesh Liberation War
 Mukti Bahini

References 

1930 births
2019 deaths
People from Kangra district
People of the Bangladesh Liberation War
Recipients of the Maha Vir Chakra
Indian Navy officers